J. D. Trennert and Son was a German type foundry established in Altona.

Typefaces
The following foundry types were issued by the Trennert foundry:

References

Letterpress font foundries of Germany
Companies of Prussia